The Mixed team archery event at the 2010 Summer Youth Olympics was part of the archery programme. It took place at the Kallang Field. Early rounds were on 18 August 2010. elimination rounds took place on 19 August. All archery was done at a range of 70 metres, with targets 1.22 metres in diameter.

Results

Seeding

Seeds were determined by adding the scores of the teammates based on the ranking rounds of the boys and girls events.  With the exception of the bottom seed players were partnered in an attempt to make all the teams even based on their combined score.

Draw

Finals

Top Half

Bottom Half

References

Elimination Bracket
Finals Bracket

Archery at the 2010 Summer Youth Olympics